Edmund Antoni Ambroziak (9 January 1945 – 20 May 2016) was an academic teacher and a politician, who served as the starosta (government leader) of Warsaw County in the Masovian Voivodeship, Poland.

History 

Ambroziak was born on 9 January 1945 in Białobrzegi, Poland. He became academic teacher, and was a councillor in the gmina (municipality) of Warsaw–Centre, and in the Warsaw County. During the 1997 Polish parliamentary election, he unsuccessfully attempted to gain the mandate to be the candidate of the Solidarity Electoral Action, in the 2nd electoral district, located around the city of Warsaw. From 1999 to 2002, he served as the starosta (government leader) of the Warsaw County. The county ceased to exist on 27 October 2002, and as such, also his office. Following that, he had retired from politics. Ambroziak had a wife and a daughter. He died on 20 May 2016 in Warsaw, and was buried at the Powązki Military Cemetery (grave no. 32A-8-8) in Warsaw.

References 

1945 births
2016 deaths
Councillors in Warsaw
Solidarity Electoral Action politicians
Burials at Powązki Military Cemetery